Gerald Michael Gabbard (born January 15, 1948) is a Samoan American politician, serving as the Hawaii State Senator for District 21 from the Democratic party, since 2006. Gabbard rose to prominence for efforts to prevent same-sex marriage in Hawai'i by passing a 1998 amendment to the Constitution of Hawaii to give the state legislature "the power to reserve marriage to opposite-sex couples" under the 1996 Defense of Marriage Act (DOMA). Gabbard, who was born in American Samoa, is the first person of Samoan descent to serve in the Hawaii Senate.

Early life and education
Gabbard was born on January 15, 1948, in Fagatogo, American Samoa, one of eight children of Aknesis Agnes (Yandall) and Benjamin Harrison Gabbard, Jr, a Samoan of American ancestry. Mike Gabbard is of Samoan and European descent from both his maternal and paternal ancestry. He was a U.S. citizen from birth because of his father's U.S. citizenship. Gabbard lived in Hawaii as a child and graduated from Choctawhatchee High School in Fort Walton Beach, Florida.  He studied at and obtained a degree in English from Sonoma State College in 1971.  He earned a master's degree in community college administration from Oregon State University.

Early career
In the 1970s and early 1980s, Gabbard taught high school English in American Samoa and was a guidance counselor and later Assistant Dean of Instruction, and Dean of Adult and Community Education at American Samoa Community College.  He also worked as a head tennis pro at the Kuilima Hyatt Resort on the North Shore of O'ahu in the mid 1970s.

From 1983 to 1987, Gabbard worked as headmaster and teacher at Ponomauloa School in Wahiawa, Hawaii.

From 1988 to 1992, Gabbard and his wife owned The Natural Deli, a vegetarian health food restaurant in Moiliili, Hawaii. Gabbard closed the restaurant following picketing by activists after Gabbard said on his self-funded radio show, "Let's Talk Straight Hawaii," on K-108, that “If [two applicants] were both the same, then I would take the one that is not homosexual.”

In the late 1980s and early 1990s, Gabbard and his wife worked for state Senator Rick Reed.

In the early 1990s, Gabbard and his wife were listed as teachers for the Science of Identity Foundation.

Gabbard and his wife later started Hawaiian Toffee Treasures, a candy company in Honolulu.

Activism

Opposition to LGBT rights
Between 1991 and 1996, Gabbard founded the organizations Stop Promoting Homosexuality Hawaii (renamed Stop Promoting Homosexuality International), Stop Promoting Homosexuality America, and the Alliance for Traditional Marriage and Values. Gabbard became well-known for his advocacy for Hawaii Constitutional Amendment 2 (1998). This amendment, approved by voters 69.2%–28.6%, gave the state legislature "the power to reserve marriage to opposite-sex couples" under the federal Defense of Marriage Act (DOMA), signed by Bill Clinton in 1996.

Other activism
Shortly after 9/11, Gabbard founded Stand Up For America (SUFA), a non-profit educational organization.

In 2007, Gabbard co-founded the non-profit Aloha Parenting Project (APP) with his wife Carol.

Political career
Gabbard was elected to the Honolulu City Council in a nonpartisan race in 2002.

In 2004, he ran unsuccessfully as a Republican for the Second Congressional District of Hawaii in the United States House of Representatives, losing to state Representative Ed Case.

On March 21, 2006, Gabbard announced his plans to run for the Hawaii State Senate in West Oahu's District 19, after 14-year incumbent Senator Brian Kanno decided not to run for reelection. On November 7, 2006, Gabbard defeated retired Honolulu police captain George Yamamoto by a 56% to 44% margin, to represent the district in the Hawaii State Senate. Gabbard was sworn in on January 17, 2007. Gabbard, who was born in American Samoa, became the first person of Samoan descent to serve in the Hawaii Senate.

On August 30, 2007, Gabbard switched from the Republican Party of Hawaii to the Democratic Party of Hawaii. His stated reason for doing so was that he believed that he could be more effective to his constituents as part of the majority party in the State Senate, where Democrats have long had a supermajority.

On November 2, 2010, Gabbard was re-elected for a second term to the Hawaii State Senate, after defeating Republican Aaron Bonar by a 74% to 26% margin. Gabbard served as the Chair of the Energy and Environment Committee from 2009 to 2015, which culminated with his leadership on the passage of a first-in-the-nation law to require Hawaii utilities to get 100% of their electricity from clean, renewable energy sources by 2045.

On November 6, 2012, Gabbard defeated Republican candidate Dean Capelouto, 72% to 28%, to represent the newly reapportioned Hawaii State Senate District 20.

During the 2016 election cycle, Gabbard was unopposed, and was re-elected to the Hawaii State Senate for a four-year term on November 8, 2016.

Political positions
Gabbard opposes same-sex marriage and civil unions. He believes marriage should only be between a man and a woman.

In 2016, while serving as the Chair of the Water, Land, and Agriculture Committee, Gabbard authored a bill banning the sale of parts and products of endangered species.

In 2018, Gabbard authored legislation that enacted a statewide ban on sunscreens that contained the controversial chemicals oxybenzone and octinoxate. The bill also included a ban on the pesticide chlorpyrifos, and upon enactment, Hawaii became the first state to ban the substance.

In 2021, Gabbard reintroduced the Hawaii Cruelty Free Cosmetics Act, which passed the Hawaii State Legislature and would make Hawaii the sixth state to ban cosmetic animal testing, after having previously introduced the bill in 2018. He received Cruelty Free International's May 2021 award for Legislator of the Month. He also introduced and passed SCR44, a resolution which made Hawaii the first state to declare a "climate emergency".

He is currently the Chair of the Agriculture and Environment Committee.

Personal life
Mike and his wife, Carol Porter, were married on December 27, 1968 in East Grand Rapids, Michigan. Porter was elected to and served on the Hawaii State Board of Education from 2000–2004. A socially-conservative Catholic, Gabbard serves as a lector at St. Jude Catholic Church in Makakilo, Hawaii.  His daughter, Tulsi Gabbard, served as a member of the U.S. House of Representatives for Hawaii's second congressional district from 2013 to 2021 and was a candidate for the Democratic presidential nomination in 2020.

See also
 List of American politicians who switched parties in office

Notes

References

External links

 

|-

|-

1948 births
American people of Samoan descent
American Roman Catholics
American anti-same-sex-marriage activists
Republican Party Hawaii state senators
Honolulu City Council members
Living people
Oregon State University alumni
American Samoan politicians
Hawaii Independents
21st-century American politicians
Choctawhatchee High School alumni
Schoolteachers from Hawaii
Democratic Party Hawaii state senators